Ludmila Christeseva (alias L. Christeseva, Belarusian: Людміла Хрысцесева), is a Swedish visual artist with Belarusian roots. She was born in 1978 in Mogilev, Belarus and  received a Master's of Arts degree from The Faculty of Artistic Design and Technology at the Vitebsk State Technological University in Belarus in 2001. Christeseva then moved to Sweden and joined the creative team of the Swedish fashion designer Lars Wallin.  
She also holds degrees from Stockholm University and The University College of Arts, Crafts and Design (Konstfack). Her artistic research focuses on gender identity and the questions relating to its representation across cultures. She actively participates in various art projects and exhibitions in Sweden and abroad. L. Christeseva runs an exhibition space, Artten, in central Stockholm, which is dedicated to women's empowerment and to the growth of consciousness within the community of art and fashion.
 
L. Christeseva's institutional exhibitions include “War´s Unwomanly Face” exhibited at the Swedish Army Museum in Stockholm (2016) and in the US Ambassador to Sweden's residence in Stockholm (2016); “Sustainidentity” at the Belarusian National History Museum (2016); “The Toiles” at the Stockholm Costume & Fashion institute (2017) and at the Nordic Museum in Stockholm (2017-2018). A series of sculptures by L. Christeseva became a unique scenography for the performance of Margaret Jenkins Dance Company (USA) in Stockholm in 2016. 
 
L. Christeseva is an art director and was the executive producer for the international exhibition “Ingmar Bergman and his Legacy in Fashion and Art”, which was shown in more than 60 countries around the world in 2018. On July 14, 2018, L. Christeseva was invited to show her installation with “The Toiles" in the context of the harsh and unique nature of Fårö as part of the worldwide celebration of Ingmar Bergman's 100-year jubilee at the Bergmancenter. 
 
In 2019, given an empowering heritage of pride, momentum and purpose that honors the example of women's suffrage attained 100 years ago, L. Christeseva organized a fashion show on Stockholm's streets bringing together a select number of Stockholm locals to participate and thereby support women who are on the way towards their creative dreams—facing both challenges and successes. Christina Johannesson, the Swedish ambassador to Belarus, and Maria Rashidi, the founder of the organization Women's Rights / Kvinnors Rätt, have participated in the project, to name a few. 
 
In her work, L. Christeseva develops several artistic movements: Sustainidenity, Pinkism and The Sky Over.

References

External links 
  Official website

Swedish women painters
Belarusian diaspora
People from Mogilev
1978 births
Living people